Mitochondrial intermediate peptidase is an enzyme that in humans is encoded by the MIPEP gene. This protein is a critical component of human mitochondrial protein import machinery involved in the maturing process of nuclear coded mitochondrial proteins that with a mitochondrial translocation peptide, especially those OXPHOS-related proteins.

Structure

Gene 

The gene MIPEP encodes one metalloprotease that hydrolyzes peptide fragment of eight amino acids in lengths to process mitochondria-targeted proteins. The human gene MIPEP has 21 Exons and locates at chromosome band13q12. Evidences showed that the human gene  MIPEP is highly expressed in the heart, skeletal muscle, and pancreas, three organ systems that are frequently reported with OXPHOS disorders.

Protein 

The human protein Mitochondrial intermediate peptidase  is 80.6 kDa in size and composed of 713 amino acids. It contains a mitonchondria targeting peptide (Amino acid 1-35 of the peptide sequence). The mature protein has a theoretical pI of 6.03.

Function 

Working in concert with general mitochondrial processing peptidase (MPP), MIPEP plays critical role in the maturation of a specific class of nuclear-encoded precursor proteins characterized by the motif, XRX(f)(F/L/I)XX(T/S/G)XXXX(f). Initially, peptidase MPP cleaves the precursors at positions two peptide bonds from the R residue, leaving a typical octapeptide at the protein N- terminus; subsequently, MIP cleaves the octapeptide, completing the final maturation of processed protein. A recent study showed that mitochondrial intermediate peptidase can degrade the transmembrane receptor Notch at its S5 site and assist Notch protein maturation.

Clinical significance 

In a GWAS (Genome-Wide Association Study) study of Chinese population, a significant association between high myopia and a variant at chromosome band region 13q12.12 was reported. MIPEP and C1QTNF9B genes locate in the same locus and appear expressed in the retina and retinal pigment epithelium (RPE) and are thus likely to be associated with high myopia. However, functional evidence linking MIPEP with myopia has yet to be provided.

Biallelic pathogenic variants in MIPEP present in infancy or early childhood with hypotonia (low muscle tone) and a rare type of cardiomyopathy, called left ventricular non-compaction. Cataracts may also be seen. In the four patients reported to date, the cardiomyopathy is progressive and results in death in the first few years of life.

First identification
Description of the human clinical phenotype of an autosomal recessive neuromuscular disorder caused by deficiency of the mitochondrial intermediate presequence protease (MIP), encoded by the gene MIPEP, was first reported by a collective with a lead author Mohammad Eldomery and senior corresponding author V. Reid Sutton in 2016 in the journal Genome Medicine. The index subject was diagnosed with left ventricular non-compaction cardiomyopathy (LVNC) and Wolf-Parkinson-White syndrome at  months of age. In an attempt to identify the etiology of this cardiac phenotype, a series of tests were performed, including clinical whole exome sequencing. Because the clinical diagnostic laboratory did not identify pathogenic variants in known disease-associated genes, re-analysis of the exome data was performed by Dr. Mohammad Eldomery as part of the Baylor-Johns Hopkins Center for Mendelian Genomics. Biallelic variants were identified in the MIPEP gene, which was known in yeast and other organisms to be important in mitochondrial protein processing. Because LVNC is seen in other mitochondrial disorders, this was considered the best candidate gene. After interrogating the Baylor Genetic Laboratory clinical database and submitting the MIPEP gene to GeneMatcher, four other affected individuals from three families were identified with biallelic variants in MIPEP. In all four patients, the phenotype is LVNC with severe hypotonia and developmental delay. All of the affected individuals, with the exception of the index case, died before 2 years of age from cardiac failure. Seizures and cataracts were also noted in some of the affected individuals. The MIPEP variants included missense variants, stop variants as well as a 1.4 Megabase deletion involving the MIPEP gene. Confirmation of the pathogenicity of these variants in MIPEP was performed in a yeast model system by Nora Vögtle and Chris Meisinger at the University of Freiburg, Germany.

References 

Mitochondrial proteins